Laurynas Grigelis, the defending champion, didn't participate this year.
Steve Johnson won the title, defeating Robert Farah 6–3, 6–3 in the final.

Seeds

Draw

Finals

Top half

Bottom half

References
 Main Draw
 Qualifying Draw

Comerica Bank Challenger - Singles
Nordic Naturals Challenger